Navigator of the Seas is a cruise ship operated by Royal Caribbean International.

History
Constructed at Kværner Masa-Yards Turku New Shipyard, Finland, the ship originally measured 138,279 gross tons and carried 3,807 passengers plus additional crew. The ship's dimensions are 1,020 feet in length with a breadth of 157.5 feet.

Operations
The ship was christened in a ceremony by its godmother, German former tennis player Steffi Graf.

 Navigator of the Seas was sailing Caribbean itineraries year-round out of Galveston, TX. Navigator of the Seas was sailing Mediterranean cruises based out of Civitavecchia, Italy until November 2012. In November 2012, she began to depart from New Orleans, Louisiana where she sailed Western Caribbean cruises until early April 2013. She returned to Civitavecchia for the Summer of 2013 before moving to Galveston, TX to undertake Mexico cruises.

In January 2014, Navigator of the Seas was modified while dry docked, this included increasing the number of cabins by removing some of the public facilities and adding a Wave Loch FlowRider surfing simulator, an outdoor movie screen and two new lounges.

In November 2015, after two seasons sailing from Galveston, Navigator of the Seas began sailing winter itineraries out of Port Everglades in Fort Lauderdale, Florida, where she sailed Eastern and Western Caribbean itineraries, and summer itineraries out of Southampton, England, where she sails to the Mediterranean and Northern Europe. From November 2016, Navigator of the Seas transitioned to sailing her winter itineraries out of Port of Miami in Miami, Florida.

Navigator of the Seas returned to service on November 19, 2021 and is home ported in Los Angeles. She rotates between 7 day Mexican Riviera cruises and 3/4 night Ensenada cruises.

Accidents and incidents
On October 28, 2018, Navigator of the Seas began taking on water after a stabilizer failed, creating a hole in the ship's hull.

References

External links
 
 

ships built in Turku
ships of Royal Caribbean International